Somerhill is a prep school in Somerhill House in Kent, overseen by Somerhill Charitable Trust. The school comprises three sections Yardley Court, Derwent Lodge and Somerhill Pre-Prep. Yardley Court is for boys aged 7–13, Derwent Lodge for girls aged 7–11 and Somerhill Pre-Prep is a mixed school for aged 2 1/2 - 7 boys and girls.

History
Yardley Court was founded in 1898 in Tonbridge, and came to the Somerhill site in 1990 in order to expand. Derwent Lodge, established in the 1930s, followed in 1993, moving from their Tunbridge Wells town centre home which they had outgrown. Somerhill Pre-Prep was established in 1995.

These three schools were separate, as the Schools at Somerhill, until 2018, when  saw the potential for integrating and building one school community with shared facilities, vision and purpose

References 

Preparatory schools in Kent
Schools in Tonbridge